Associação Desportiva Portomosense is a Portuguese football club in Porto de Mós in the district of Leiria.

Appearances

Tier 3 (II Div. B): 2
III Divisão: 13

League history

External links
Official website 

Football clubs in Portugal
Association football clubs established in 1974
1974 establishments in Portugal